Sébastien Le Meaux (born 11 March 1976) is a retired French Paralympic judoka who competed at international judo competitions. He is a European champion and a two-time Paralympic medalist.

Le Meaux was diagnosed with Stargardt's disease when he was seventeen following an motorcycle accident; he is left with 5% visual acuity.

References

1976 births
Living people
People from Guingamp
French male judoka
Paralympic judoka of France
Judoka at the 2000 Summer Paralympics
Judoka at the 2004 Summer Paralympics
Medalists at the 2000 Summer Paralympics
Medalists at the 2004 Summer Paralympics
Sportspeople from Côtes-d'Armor
21st-century French people